Qaryeh Ali (also Romanized as Qaryeh ‘Alī; also known as Moḩammadābād and Muhammadābād) is a village in Khorramdasht Rural District, in the Central District of Kuhbanan County, Kerman Province, Iran. At the 2006 census, its population was 828, in 237 families.

References 

Populated places in Kuhbanan County